Stagecoach in Hull is a bus operator providing services in Kingston upon Hull, East Riding of Yorkshire, England. It is a subsidiary of Stagecoach East Midlands, a subdivision of the Stagecoach Group.

History

Stagecoach in Hull's origins can be traced back to Hull Corporation Transport, whose tramway operations began in 1899. Motorbus operations would first begin in 1909 with a fleet of six buses, later restarting in 1921 and expanding alongside the city's trolleybus network. The network was abandoned in 1963, replaced by fleets of Leyland Atlantean motorbuses. Hull Corporation Transport were one of the quickest operators of one-person operated buses, and in November 1972, became the first bus operator in the United Kingdom to phase out the use of conductors. In the early 1970s, Hull Corporation Transport was renamed to Kingston upon Hull City Transport (KHCT). 

Prior to deregulation, KHCT shared Hull's bus network with then-National Bus Company subsidiary East Yorkshire Motor Services (EYMS), which had been split into three fare zones following a co-ordination agreement in 1934, in which both companies could gain a share of bus fares around the city. KHCT's operating area would expand throughout the 1970s with the construction of both the Bransholme and Orchard Park housing estates, and in 1980, KHCT entered into the Crown Card weekly ticket scheme with East Yorkshire. To comply with the Transport Act 1985 and ensuing deregulation of the bus industry, in 1986 the assets of KHCT were transferred to a new legal entity, while two garages on Cottingham Road and Holderness Road were closed, resulting in a significant downsizing of KHCT's bus fleet.

Following deregulation, the co-ordination agreement between KHCT and EYMS, which was now owned by its management, was abolished, and the two operators became engaged in competition from the late 1980s until 1994. Both companies began operating competitively on each other's network of services, while KHCT was challenged by smaller independent operators entering Hull's bus network, including City Traveller, Connor & Graham, Metro Citybus and Pride of the Road/North Bank Travel. These operators would eventually go bankrupt or were taken over by either KHCT or EYMS, with the former Citilink brand retained as a low-cost subsidiary of KHCT until it was wound up in 1992.

As a consequence of competition around Hull and Humberside, KHCT incurred heavy losses, losing £2 million and incurring £782,000 in debts in 1993. KHCT were also removed from the Crown Card ticket scheme amid competition with EYMS a year prior. The company was subject to a hostile takeover bid from EYMS, though while the bid was rejected, faced with escalating losses and increased competition, Kingston upon Hull City Council sold KHCT to Stockton-on-Tees based Cleveland Transit in December 1993. This deal saw KHCT's employees take a 49% stake in the company, and a year later, led to KHCT's 'bus war' with EYMS ending after both companies agreed to co-ordinate their Hull timetables. Half of the city council's £2.7 million profit from the sale, however, would be lost to a £1.4 million debt owned to Humberside County Council.

Stagecoach ownership
In November 1994, Cleveland Transit, considered one of the emerging 'groups' within the British bus industry with acquisitions in County Durham, Teesside and Yorkshire, was sold to Stagecoach Holdings for £7.7 million. KHCT's blue and white livery, a modified version based on Cleveland Transit's green livery, was maintained by Stagecoach. However on 1 January 1996, KHCT was formally renamed Stagecoach Kingston upon Hull, later shortened to Stagecoach in Hull, with the Stagecoach corporate livery being introduced by the spring of 1996.

Stagecoach Kingston upon Hull and twelve other bus companies in Hull were summoned to the Restrictive Practices Court by the Office of Fair Trading in November 1998 after investigations revealed they were taking part in a price fixing and market sharing "cartel" on tendered Hull City Council school bus services. The OFT stated that they had uncovered evidence of representatives of the thirteen companies, including Stagecoach, secretly meeting at a Hull hotel to agree on the minimum prices they would bid to run the services and what services each company would bid for.

Stagecoach in Hull introduced the Frequento network in 2006, with routes serving Orchard Park Estate, Bransholme and later Sutton-on-Hull being operated to more frequent timetables using new low-floor buses. The service was initially launched with nine new Dennis Trident Alexander ALX400s. These were later supplemented with 14 Alexander Dennis Enviro300s in 2010 and nine Alexander Dennis Enviro400s in 2011, the latter of which were named after notable Hull people such as William Wilberforce, Philip Larkin and Mick Ronson.

250 workers at Stagecoach in Hull affiliated with Unite the Union entered a period of strike action from 7 October to 7 November 2022 in a pay dispute, disrupting bus services provided for the annual Hull Fair. The strike was scheduled to last until 29 December, however negotiations between Stagecoach management and Unite representatives involving Acas resulted in the strike suspended on 7 November and formally ended on 11 November, with workers receiving a backdated 20% pay rise of up to £13 an hour.

Services

Simplibus network

Stagecoach in Hull was the second operator in Stagecoach East Midlands to launch a 'Simplibus' network, following on from Stagecoach Grimsby-Cleethorpes in 2014. The new network saw existing routes renumbered from west to east into a numerical sequence of 1–16, as well as providing new services connecting Orchard Park Estate, Kingswood and East Hull. The new services launched on 6 September 2015 and replaced the previous Frequento network.

The new Simplibus services would later result in a combined £8.4 million investment in a fleet of new buses over three years, with Stagecoach in Hull receiving 46 new Alexander Dennis Enviro400 MMC and Enviro200 MMC double and single-decker buses between 2016 and 2019, all delivered new with Simplibus branding.

The launch of the new Stagecoach Group liveries in 2020 has seen the Simplibus branding slowly phased out. As well as this, some of the routes introduced in 2015 have either been heavily rerouted or withdrawn.

Council tenders
Stagecoach in Hull first took on the Priory Park Park & Ride services from CT Plus in September 2014, following a retendering process by Hull City Council. The company invested in five single deckers, three of which were given blue route-branding for the service, with the aim of improving bus services for the 2017 City of Culture events.

Retendering by the East Riding of Yorkshire Council in 2019 saw Stagecoach in Hull gain the contract to operate a seasonal park and ride service in Bridlington from East Yorkshire, also launching a '99' bus service operating from Hull to Bridlington three times a day. Stagecoach would later gain Hull City Council bus service contracts from East Yorkshire in 2021, being awarded funding to run both an East Hull supermarket shuttle and services connecting West Hull estates.

References

External links

Stagecoach in Hull website

Stagecoach Group bus operators in England
Transport in Kingston upon Hull
Companies based in Kingston upon Hull
Bus operators in the East Riding of Yorkshire